Joca may refer to:

Footballers
Joca (footballer, born 1981), full name Ricardo Jorge da Silva Pinto Pereira, Portuguese former football midfielder
Joca (footballer, born 1995), full name João Carlos Almeida Leandro, Portuguese football defender
Joca (footballer, born 1996), full name Jorge Samuel Figueiredo Fernandes, Portuguese football midfielder

Places
Joca Marques, a municipality in the state of Piauí, Brazil
Joca Claudino, a municipality in the state of Paraíba, Brazil